H.E.L.P. is an American television drama series which aired on ABC for one season as a mid-season replacement for Mission: Impossible, which was a replacement for Mr. Belvedere in March 1990. The series was created by Christopher Crowe and Dick Wolf, and starred John Mahoney as Chief Patrick Meacham of the New York City Fire Department. Wesley Snipes played police officer Lou Barton and David Caruso played police officer Frank Sardoni of the NYPD.

The premise of the show was based on an experimental combined emergency services station (the Harlem Eastside Life-saving Program, or HELP) in New York City that co-located the resources of the Fire Department, Police Department and Emergency Medical Services.

Although H.E.L.P. was canceled after only a brief initial season, the concept of a show involving all three branches of NYC emergency services was successfully reintroduced nine years later with the 1999 debut of Third Watch, which ran for six seasons on NBC.

Cast
John Mahoney as Chief Patrick Meacham
Tom Bresnahan as Jimmy Ryan
David Caruso as Off. Frank Sordoni
Lance Edwards as Mike Pappas
Kim Flowers as Suki Rodriguez
Wesley Snipes as Officer Lou Barton
Fionnula Flanagan as Kathlenn Meacham

Episodes

External links
 

American Broadcasting Company original programming
1990 American television series debuts
1990 American television series endings
1990s American drama television series
Television shows set in New York City
Television series by Disney–ABC Domestic Television
Television series by Universal Television
English-language television shows
Television series by Wolf Films
Television series created by Christopher Crowe (screenwriter)
Television series created by Dick Wolf